Beatriz Shantal is a Mexican actress, singer, and model.  She began her career as an actress on the telenovela Rubí  Beatriz is a New Voice of Goldie Goldie & Bear Beatriz then joined the cast of Rebelde as Paula/Paola.  She has also acted in Verano de Amor,  Zacatillo, and Eva Luna, and has taken roles in the musicals Rent and 'El Diluvio que viene' .

She has modelled for Calvin Klein, CoverGirl México, and Garnier. She has also released three records: Desde que te vi, Sal en el Café, and No Calles Más, and Beatriz was nominated for the Latin Grammy 2011.

She survived a plane crash on 11 April 2013.

References

1984 births
Living people
Mexican actresses
Mexican female models

pt:Beatriz Shantal